This is a list of notable people from the  prefecture of Tochigi, Japan.

Politicians and activists
Mayumi Moriyama, Japanese politician and former cabinet member
Yoshimi Watanabe, the president of Your Party
Toshimitsu Motegi, Japanese politician, several times a minister, including minister of foreign affairs in 2019 - 2021

Athletes
Ayagawa Gorōji, the second yokozuna sumo wrestler
Hiromi Hara, former footballer
Yumiko Hara, marathon runner
Hokutōriki Hideki, sumo wrestler
Takuro Ishii, baseball player for the Yokohama BayStars
Guts Ishimatsu, boxer, actor and comedian
Toshiaki Kawada, professional wrestler
Tochigiyama Moriya, sumo wrestler
Yoko Shibui, marathon runner
Akashi Shiganosuke, first-ever yokozuna sumo wrestler
Hidetoshi Wakui, footballer
Shunsuke Watanabe, baseball player for the Chiba Lotte Marines

Entertainers
Arisa Komiya, voice actress and actress
Minori Chihara, voice actress and a singer
Toshio Furukawa, voice actor
Rina Koike, actor and model
Hikaru Midorikawa, voice actor
Fumie Mizusawa, voice actress
Yūko Ōshima, singer (AKB48) and actress
Fumika Suzuki, gravure idol and model
Umi Tenjin, voice actor
Tomoko Yamaguchi, actress and singer
Hitomi Honda, singer (AKB48, Iz*One)

Musicians, composers and artists
Yasushi Ishii, composer
Tanaka Isson, artist
Shima Kakoku, artist and photographer
Masao Urino, writer and director
Nobuko Yoshiya, novelist
Toyotarou, mangaka
Chisaki Morito, singer

Notorious
Chiyo Aizawa, high-profile murderer
Yoshio Kodaira, rapist and serial killer
Hiroshi Ogawa, murderer (less well known as a baseball player)

Miscellaneous
Masaru Ibuka, co-founder of Sony
Hiromichi Kataura, carbon nanotube research
Kuniaki Koiso, World War II general
Takeji Nara, World War II general
Yumio Nasu, World War II major general
Namihei Odaira, founder of Hitachi
Tsutomu Oohashi, scientist

References

Tochigi
Tochigi Prefecture